Éric Beugnot (born March 22, 1955) is a French former professional basketball player. Standing at 2.00 m (6' 6 ") tall, Beugnot played at the shooting guard and small forward positions.

Professional career
During his pro career, Beugnot played with the French clubs Le Mans, AS Monaco, ASVEL, and CRO Lyon. He won 3 French League championships, in the years 1978, 1979, and 1982.

National team career
Beugnot was a member of the senior French national basketball team. With France, he played in 212 games, from 1975 to 1987, scoring a total of 2,493 points. He played at the 1984 Summer Olympic Games.

He also played at the 1986 FIBA World Championship, at the 1977 EuroBasket, the 1979 EuroBasket, the 1981 EuroBasket, the 1983 EuroBasket, and the 1987 EuroBasket.

Managerial career
After his playing career, Beugnot became the Sports Director of PSG Racing, in 1992, and became the general manager of ASVEL, in 1995.

Personal life
Beugnot's brother, Grég, and his father, Jean-Paul, were also professional basketball players.

References

External links
 
 Eric Beugnot at FIBA Europe
 
 Eric Beugnot at LNB.fr 

1955 births
Living people
AS Monaco Basket players
ASVEL Basket players
Basketball players at the 1984 Summer Olympics
Basket CRO Lyon players
French men's basketball players
Le Mans Sarthe Basket players
Olympic basketball players of France
Power forwards (basketball)
Shooting guards
Small forwards
1986 FIBA World Championship players
Mediterranean Games silver medalists for France
Mediterranean Games medalists in basketball
Competitors at the 1975 Mediterranean Games